Alice Yotopoulos-Marangopoulos (1916/17 – 31 August 2018) was a Greek lawyer and criminologist.

Career
Born Aliki Giotopoulou (or Yotopoulou), the daughter of a lawyer, she served as Professor of Criminology, President of the Hellenic Society of Criminology, board member of the International Society of Criminology, lawyer at the Supreme Court, Vice President of the Bar Association of Athens, President of the Panteion University, President of the National Commission for Human Rights and as the 10th President of the International Alliance of Women (1989–1996). She was founder and President of the Marangopoulos Foundation for Human Rights.

Publications
 Les mobiles du délit : étude de criminologie et de droit pénal : The Motives of Crime: Study of Criminology and Criminal Law (1973)
The Peculiarities of Female Criminality and their Causes: A Human Rights Perspective (1992), Esperia
Women's rights: human rights (1994), Estia
Affirmative action : towards effective gender equality, (1998)

References

Year of birth uncertain
Date of birth missing
1910s births
2018 deaths
Greek centenarians
Women centenarians
Greek feminists
Greek women lawyers
Greek criminologists
International Alliance of Women people
20th-century Greek lawyers
21st-century Greek lawyers
Greek women criminologists
Writers from Corfu
20th-century women lawyers
21st-century women lawyers